The H.G. Newman Building is a historic commercial building located in downtown Evansville, Indiana. It was built in 1900, and is a two-story, Late Victorian style brick building.  The building features decorative brickwork and parapet, and round arched openings.  It was originally built to house a wholesale grocery and farmers' supply.

It was listed on the National Register of Historic Places in 1982.

References

Commercial buildings on the National Register of Historic Places in Indiana
Victorian architecture in Indiana
Commercial buildings completed in 1900
Buildings and structures in Evansville, Indiana
National Register of Historic Places in Evansville, Indiana